Precision Time Protocol (PTP) is a widely adopted protocol for delivery of precise time over a computer network. A complete PTP system includes PTP functionality in network equipment and hosts. PTP may be implemented in hardware, software or a combination of both.

PTP is implemented in end systems and in PTP-aware networking hardware. PTP implementations may have the ability to serve as a source of time for the network, a grandmaster, or operate as a slave and receive time and synchronize to the grandmaster. Some implementations are able to operate as either master or slave.

Routers and switches
 Artel 1G Quarra Switch
 Artel 10Gig Quarra Switch
 ACRA CONTROL (now Curtiss-Wright) airborne switches
 Alcatel-Lucent 7210 Service Access Switch
 Alcatel-Lucent 7705 Service Aggregation Router
 Alcatel-Lucent 7750 Service Router
 Allen-Bradley Stratix 5400, 5410, 5700, 8000 Managed Switches
 Arista 7050X/X2/X3 Series Switches
 Arista 7060X/X2 Series Switches
 Arista 7150 Series Switches
 Arista 7280E/R/R2 Series Switches
 Arista 7500E/R/R2 Series Switches
 Aruba 2930M Series Switches (with WC.16.04 software release)
 Aruba CX 6300 M series
 Aruba CX 8360 
 BitStream Hyperion 300/402/500 Series Switches
Brocade 6910 Ethernet Access Switch
Dell EMC PowerSwitch S4100-ON Series Switches
Dell EMC PowerSwitch S5200-ON Series Switches 
Cisco 7600 Router 
Cisco ASR 903 Router 
Cisco ASR 9000 Router 
Cisco Catalyst 9300 Switch 
Cisco CGS 2520 Switch 
Cisco Industrial Ethernet 3000 Series Switches
Cisco Industrial Ethernet 5000 Series Switches
Cisco Nexus 3000 Series Switches 
Cisco Nexus 5000 Series Switches 
Cisco Nexus 7000 router
Cisco Nexus 9000 router
Connect Tech Inc. Xtreme/10G Managed Ethernet Switch/Router 
Crystal Instruments IEEE 1588 Spider-HUB Industrial Ethernet Switch 
Ericsson Router 6000 series 
Extreme Networks E4G-200 router 
Extreme Networks E4G-400 router 
Fibrolan Falcon-R Class xHaul Switche/Grandmaster
Fibrolan Falcon-M Class Switches/Routers
Fibrolan Falcon-MTS Grandmaster
Fibrolan uFalcon-S Switch series
Fibrolan uFalcon-ST Switch series
GarrettCom 10KT Industrial Managed 1588v2 Switch
GarrettCom 12KX Industrial Managed 1588v2 Ethernet Switch
HBM Rugged Ethernet PTPv2 Switch with PoE: SomatXR EX23-R
Hirschmann MACH1040 19" Industrial Ethernet Switches with IEEE 1588v2 support
Hirschmann MICE Modular Industrial Ethernet Rail Switch Modules with IEEE 1588v2 support
IBM RackSwitch G8264 and IBM RackSwitch G8316 
iS5 Communications Raptor Switch 
Juniper Networks MX Universal Edge Routers
Juniper Networks QFX
Kyland SICOM3028GPT series
Kyland SICOM3000A series
Kyland Ruby3A
Mellanox SN2100 / SN2700 (Spectrum silicon) switches with MLNX-OS/ONYX (in GA since 3.6.5011) for PTP IEEE-1588 (SMPTE ST2059-2 profile) or with Cumulus Linux (from version 3.6) with the ptp4l Linux package.
Moxa PowerTrans series (PT-7728-PTP) and EDS-500 and EDS-600 series switches
Oregano Systems syn1588 Gbit Switch
Planet Technology USA, some IGS switches (e.g. IGS-20040MT) 
Red Lion N-Tron Series NT24k All-Gigabit Managed Industrial Ethernet Switches 
Ruggedcom IEEE 1588 PTP Solutions including RSG2488, RSG2288, RX1000 and RS416
Seven Solutions White Rabbit Precise PTP Switch 
Siemens SCALANCE X-300 and XR-300 Industrial Managed Ethernet Switch with 1588 support (all X308-2M, all XR-324-12M, all XR324-4M, all X302-7EEC and X307-2EEC)
Teletronics Technology Corporation airborne switches
TSN Systems - TSN Automotive Switch Q50.

Stand-alone solutions
 Antenna-integrated OTMC 100 PTP grandmaster clock from OMICRON Lab 
AVN-GMCS IEEE1588 PTP Grandmaster Clock with GPS Receiver from Sonifex 
Calnex Solutions provides a number of IEEE 1588v2 test products for field and factory use including Paragon-X, Paragon-100G and Sentinel
EKOSync 1588A and 1588B IEEE 1588v2 PTP/NTP GPS clocks from EKOSinerji 
FSMLabs 1GBps Pocket GrandMaster IEEE 1588v2 PTP/NTP GPS clocks from FSMLabs
FSMLabs 10GBps Enterprise GrandMaster IEEE 1588v2 PTP/NTP GPS clocks from FSMLabs
IEEE 1588 PTP GPS Grandmaster Clock from Optimal Technologies
IEEE 1588 PTP M68 production module from Qulsar (formerly Conemtech) 
IEEE 1588 PTP P6x Sub-System board from Qulsar (formerly Conemtech) 
IEEE 1588 PTP PCIe add in cards from Korusys
IEEE 1588 PTP Solutions from FEI-Zyfer, Inc.
IEEE 1588 PTP Solutions from Fibrolan
IEEE 1588 PTP solutions from Microsemi
IEEE 1588 PTP Solutions from Oscilloquartz SA
IEEE 1588 PTP testers and monitoring solutions from Albedo Telecom
IEEE 1588 PTP Time Converter TICRO 100 from OMICRON Lab 
IEEE 1588 solutions from Meinberg
IEEE 1588v2 PTP GPS Master & Slave clocks from Masterclock
IEEE 1588v2 PTP GPS Master & Slave clocks from Tekron
IEEE 1588v2 PTP GPS Smartgrid clocks from Tekron
IPITEK MSP-1588
syn1588 VIP single chip solution from Oregano Systems
TSN Systems TSN Box 3.0 - Hardware Interface for Automotive and Industrial TSN Test & Measurement Applications.
White Rabbit LEN from Seven Solutions
White Rabbit ZEN Time Provider from Seven Solutions
White Rabbit Cute-WR-DP from SyncTechnology
White Rabbit Mini-WR from SyncTechnology
IEEE 1588 PTP solutions from Mobatime (belongs to the Moser-Baer Group)
IEEE 1588 PTP Solutions from PolyNet

Software
 Domain Time II PTPv2 server and client for Windows and Linux from Greyware Automation Products, Inc.
IEEE 1588 Hoptroff Time Suite Enterprise from Hoptroff Smart Timing | Built on the Zero Trust model and encrypted to maximum standards to ensure resilient cybersecurity, delivered via dedicated optic fibre connection | MiFID II, CAT FINRA NMS compliance |  
 IEEE 1588 Protocol Software from HMS Industrial Networks (formerly IXXAT Automation GmbH).
 IEEE 1588 PTP 2002/2008 Master Stack Software from Real-Time Systems GmbH.
 IEEE 1588 PTP Stack, XR7 PTP, from TTTech Flexibilis Oy
 IEEE 1588 Stack from Civica Ltd.
Microsoft Windows Server 2019
Microsoft Windows 10 October 2018 Update (version 1809)
 Openptp from Flexibilis Oy is GPL licensed open source implementation of the IEEE 1588-2008 (Version 2) PTP specification.
PTP Track Hound, free tool from Meinberg to record, visualize and analyze PTP network traffic
 PPSi, a multi-platform ptp implementation developed by CERN.
 PTPd and its derivatives
 syn1588 PTP Stack from Oregano Systems: A portable implementation of the complete IEEE1588-2008 standard with special features like Boundary Clock support, Unicast operation, IPv6 support and security enhancements.
 The Linux PTP Project – an implementation of the Precision Time Protocol (PTP) according to IEEE standard 1588 for Linux. The dual design goals are to provide a robust implementation of the standard and to use the most relevant and modern Application Programming Interfaces (API) offered by the Linux kernel.
Timebeat - PTP synchronisation platform and monitoring solution.
 TimeKeeper PTP server and client from FSMLabs, Inc.
 TSEP Chronos: IEEE 1588 PTP 2008 Stack for Windows, Linux, and RTX64(IntervalZero) from Technical Software Engineering Plazotta.
 TsEX module of the NeEX platform - IEEE1588 compliant PTP stack by emagine  
UMAN PTP Stack - 802.1AS (gPTP), Automotive PTP 1.5.

Silicon
8-Input, 14-Output, Dual DPLL Timing IC with IEEE 1588 Clock from Microsemi Corporation
IEEE 1588 PTP Grandmaster Controller from Qulsar (formerly Conemtech) 
IEEE 1588 PTP Ethernet Switching Solutions from Vitesse Semiconductor
IEEE 1588 PTP Synchronization Solutions from Zarlink Semiconductor
IEEE 1588 PTP Synchronization Solutions from Semtech Corporation
IEEE 1588 Clock and 10/100/1000Mbit/s Packet Timestamper from Microsemi Corporation
IEEE 1588 PTP Synchronization of Network Communications Equipment from Integrated Device Technology
BroadPTP in network equipment using Broadcom silicon.

Other
IEEE 1588 PTP 1Gb Ethernet Layer 2 Switch IP Core from Flexibilis Oy
IEEE 1588 PTP Compliance from The White Rabbit Project in the Open Hardware Repository.
IEEE 1588 PTP Embedded Timing Appliance from Black Brook Design
IEEE 1588 PTP Hoptroff Traceable Time as a Service (TTaaS®) from Hoptroff Smart Timing
IEEE 1588 PTP IP Core from IXXAT Automation GmbH
IEEE 1588 PTP IP Core from OpenCores
IEEE 1588 PTP IP Cores for Xilinx FPGAs from System-on-Chip engineering
IEEE 1588 PTP IP Cores from Optimal Technologies
IEEE 1588 PTP Solutions for industrial Ethernet networking and computing from Moxa
IEEE 1588 PTP Solutions from ELPROMA and CERN
IEEE 1588 PTP Solutions from EndRun Technologies
IEEE 1588 PTP Solutions from InES ZHAW
IEEE 1588 PTP Solutions from Meinberg Funkuhren
IEEE 1588 PTP Solutions from Microsemi
IEEE 1588 PTP Solutions from NetTimeLogic GmbH
IEEE 1588 PTP / White Rabbit Solutions from OPNT B.V.
IEEE 1588 PTP Solutions from Oregano Systems 
IEEE 1588 PTP Solutions from Oscilloquartz
IEEE 1588 PTP Solutions from Qulsar (formerly Conemtech) 
IEEE 1588 PTP Solutions from Orolia (formerly Spectracom)
IEEE 1588 PTP Solutions from Time & Frequency Solutions
IEEE 1588 PTP Solutions from Trimble.Inc
IEEE 1588 PTP Synchronization Solutions from Integrated Device Technology
IEEE 1588-2008 Management Tool from IXXAT Automation GmbH
IEEE 1588 PTP Solutions from Polynet

References

Synchronization
IEEE standards
Network time-related software